The 2013 NCAA Division I men's soccer season was the 55th season of NCAA championship men's college soccer. There were 203 teams in men's Division I competition. The defending champions were the Indiana Hoosiers who defeated the Georgetown Hoyas in the 2012 College Cup. The season concluded with Notre Dame defeating Maryland 2–1 to win its first NCAA soccer title.

Changes from 2012

New programs 
 Grand Canyon joined the WAC after previously playing in NCAA Division II.
 UMass Lowell joined the America East Conference after previously playing in NCAA Division II.
 Incarnate Word joined the Southland Conference, but is playing as an independent after having been an NCAA Division II member.

Discontinued programs 
 Richmond dropped the sport, as well as men's track and field, following the school's decision to add men's lacrosse as a varsity sport.
 Mount St. Mary's dropped the sport, as well as men's and women's golf, for economic reasons.
 Towson dropped the sport due to budgetary concerns. Plans to cut baseball were delayed after late funding increases.

Programs leaving Division I
 Adelphi reclassified its men's soccer program to Division II, reuniting that team with the rest of its athletic program in the Northeast-10 Conference.

Conference realignment

Conference changes 
 The original Big East Conference split into two conferences. The schools that do not sponsor FBS football now operate as the Big East Conference under a new charter, while the FBS schools now operate under the original Big East charter with the new name of American Athletic Conference. Both conferences sponsor soccer.
 The Mountain Pacific Sports Federation dropped men's soccer.
 The Western Athletic Conference added men's soccer, with several ex-MPSF teams joining the conference for 2013

Season overview

Pre-season polls 
Several American soccer outlets posted their own preseason top 25 rankings of what were believed to be the strongest men's collegiate soccer teams entering 2013.

Regular season

Standings

Major upsets 

In this list, a "major upset" is defined as a game won by a team ranked 10 or more spots lower or an unranked team that defeats a team ranked #15 or higher.

Conference regular season and tournament winners

Statistics

Individuals

Last weekly update on December 16, 2013. Source: NCAA.com – Total GoalsLast weekly update on December 16, 2013. Source: NCAA.com – Goals Against Average

Last weekly update on December 16, 2013. Source: NCAA.com – Total AssistsLast weekly update on December 16, 2013. Source: NCAA.com – Save pct

Last weekly update on December 16, 2013. Source: NCAA.com – Total PointsLast weekly update on December 16, 2013. Source: NCAA.com – Total Saves

Teams
Last weekly update on December 16, 2013. Source: NCAA.com – Goals/GameLast weekly update on December 16, 2013. Source: NCAA.com – Team GAA

Last weekly update on December 16, 2013. Source: NCAA.com – SO PctLast weekly update on December 16, 2013. Source: NCAA.com – Team W-L-T pct

NCAA tournament

The College Cup was played at PPL Park in Chester, Pennsylvania on December 13 & 15, 2013. In the semifinals, Notre Dame defeated New Mexico, and Maryland beat Virginia. In the Finals, Notre Dame prevailed 2–1 for its first championship.

Award winners

Hermann Trophy/National Player of the Year
The Hermann Trophy for the national men's Player of the Year was awarded by the Missouri Athletic Club and the  National Soccer Coaches Association of America to Patrick Mullins of Maryland. Mullins became the fourth man and the seventh player overall to win the trophy in back-to-back years.

NSCAA/Continental Tire Men's NCAA Division I All-America Team 

On December 9, 2013, the National Soccer Coaches Association of America released their All-American teams for the 2011 NCAA Division I men's soccer season. The list included a first, second and third team.

First teamSecond team

Third team

See also 
 College soccer
 List of NCAA Division I men's soccer programs
 2013 in American soccer
 2013 NCAA Division I Men's Soccer Championship

References 

 
NCAA